Wayne Edwards (born June 23, 1967) is an American professional stock car racing driver. He has driven for numerous teams over the past eight years. He is not related to fellow stock car driver Carl Edwards despite having the same last name.

Racing career
Edwards made his Truck Series debut in 2000, driving the No. 93 WorldBestBuy.com Chevy for Troxell Racing. His debut came at Homestead-Miami. There he started 30th and finished 27th, fifteen laps down. In twelve other races, his best finish was a 19th at NHIS, and posting a best qualifying effort of 27th twice. He made another pair of starts in 2001, both coming again with Troxell Racing. He was 34th at Gateway and 35th at California, failing to finish both races. However, he did set his best career start of 21st at California.

In 2002, Edwards made three starts for Team Racing. His best finish came at Darlington Raceway, where he finished 25th. He also drove at Texas Motor Speedway for Steve Portenga, finishing 33rd after an early vibration. He followed that up with eight starts in 2003, his best finish a 22nd at Texas driving the No. 95 for Scott Upshaw. He also made his Busch Series debut at Pikes Peak International Raceway driving the No. 22 for Bost Motorsports. He started 38th but finished 43rd due to a transmission failure on the first lap. Edwards ran four more races in 2004. He set his best career finish to that point with a fifteenth at Daytona International Speedway, and then had a 28th finish in the inaugural race at Atlanta driving for Troxell, but did not finish either of his next two starts in the No. 0 Loni Richardson-owned Chevy. He attempted the Emerson Radio 250 in the No. 70 Davis Motorsports Chevy, but failed to qualify.

Edwards returned to Troxell full-time in 2005, which had been newly renamed Mighty Motorsports. He started the season by dodging a last lap wreck, and driving the No. 24 truck to a 9th place at Daytona, his best career finish. Also, Edwards was able to finish four of his other nine starts, the best of those being a 23rd at Loudon. He finished 33rd in points. He also made his second career Busch start at Kentucky Speedway driving the No. 91 Speed Zone Energy Drink Dodge, finishing 36th after suffering transmission failure. Edwards attempted to make the first handful of races in 2006 in Mighty's No. 24 Liquid Nitro Energy Drink truck, but failed. He made his first start of the season at Kentucky for Green Light finishing 33rd after suffering vibration problems in his No. 07 U.S. Restoration Chevy. He drove two more races for Green Light in the No. 03 Chevy, but did not finish higher than 35th. In 2007, Edwards started two races for Upshaw Racing, but left after the stopped running. He made three appearances for Green Light's No. 06 Chevy, and drove two races for Andy Hillenburg, with a best finish of 28th. He also attempted a race in Andy Belmont's truck, but failed to qualify.

In 2008, he raced for FDNY Racing, and SS-Green Light Racing, making five starts altogether. Edwards raced the first two races of 2009 for Gun Broker Racing finishing 36th at Daytona and 34th at Auto Club Speedway. For the rest of the 2009 season, Edwards start and parked in the No. 47 and No. 48 trucks owned by Andy Hillenburg.

Motorsports career results

NASCAR
(key) (Bold – Pole position awarded by qualifying time. Italics – Pole position earned by points standings or practice time. * – Most laps led.)

Busch Series

Camping World Truck Series

 Season still in progress
 Ineligible for series points

ARCA Racing Series
(key) (Bold – Pole position awarded by qualifying time. Italics – Pole position earned by points standings or practice time. * – Most laps led.)

References

External links
 
 

Living people
1967 births
People from Shepherdsville, Kentucky
Racing drivers from Kentucky
NASCAR drivers
ARCA Menards Series drivers